The Sharps Island Light is the third lighthouse to stand nearly 3 miles (5 km) south-southwest from the southern end of Tilghman Island in Maryland's Chesapeake Bay. The structure is best known today for evoking the Leaning Tower of Pisa, a condition caused by an ice floe in 1977.

The first lighthouse was built on Sharps Island in 1838, but due to the island's erosion it was moved in 1848. This was replaced with a screwpile lighthouse in 1866 near the original location of the first structure.

The second lighthouse lasted until 1881 when it was forced off its foundations by an ice floe. It floated nearly five miles down the Chesapeake—with its keepers still inside—until it ran aground, allowing the men to escape unharmed.

The current light, a sparkplug lighthouse, was constructed in 1882 with a concrete caisson foundation and a  cast iron tower. The tower includes an integral dwelling and was staffed until 1938 when the United States Coast Guard automated the light. Leaning by about 15° since it was ice-damaged in 1977, the structure is picturesque, but in poor condition.

The Sharps Island Light was listed on the National Register of Historic Places (reference # 82002821) on July 22, 1982. It is one of the many historic features along Captain John Smith Chesapeake National Historic Trail.

It is also on the Lighthouse Digest Doomsday List of endangered lighthouses.

As of 2006, the lighthouse was a candidate for sale under the National Historic Lighthouse Preservation Act. It was deactivated in January 2010.

References

Further reading
Hanks, Douglas, Coast Guard Eyes Lighthouse for Demolition Officials say, Sharp's Island beacon may cost more than it's worth (March, 1996) Lighthouse Digest.

External links

Aerial photographs at Marinas.com.
Chesapeake Bay Gateways Network, Sharps Island Light.
Chesapeake Lights, U.S. Lighthouse Society, Sharps Island Light including timeline.
Chesapeake Bay Lighthouse Project - Sharps Island Light

Lighthouses completed in 1838
Lighthouses completed in 1882
Lighthouses in the Chesapeake Bay
Inclined towers
Lighthouses on the National Register of Historic Places in Maryland
Transportation buildings and structures in Talbot County, Maryland
National Register of Historic Places in Talbot County, Maryland